The Unleash the Beast Series (UTB) is the Premier Series of the Professional Bull Riders (PBR). Monster Beverage Corporation is the current series sponsor for the premiership since 2018. From its founding in 1994 until 2002, it was sponsored by Anheuser-Busch (Bud Light Cup Series), and the Ford Motor Company (Built Ford Tough Series) from 2003 to 2017. The top 40 riders and top bulls compete at each event. It culminates at the PBR Unleash the Beast World Finals at the end of the regular season. The UTB series includes 24 events across the United States each year. Pyrotechnics, pulsating music, and special effects open each event. UTB events range from one to three days, with all 40 riders competing in the long rounds, then the top 12 returning to the Championship Round to determine the event champion. 

 From 2015 to 2021, four regular season Premier Series events were Majors. The first major event of the year was the Buck Off at the Garden in Madison Square Garden in New York, New York.

 Next came the Iron Cowboy, which took place at AT&T Stadium in Arlington, Texas from 2010 to 2018 before moving to the Staples Center in Los Angeles, California in 2019. 

 The third Major of the year was the Last Cowboy Standing, which took place in Las Vegas, Nevada from 2011 to 2018, with the exception of the one-off year in 2012 when the event was held at Ford Field in Detroit, Michigan. In July 2019, the Last Cowboy Standing event found a new home at Cheyenne Frontier Days in Cheyenne, Wyoming. In 2020, Cheyenne Frontier Days was canceled for the first time in its 124-year history. This was due to the COVID-19 pandemic. It ultimately effected the Last Cowboy Standing event as well. Cheyenne Frontier Days returned in 2021, as did the Last Cowboy Standing event.

 The last major event of the season was the Music City Knockout, which took place at Bridgestone Arena in Nashville, Tennessee. In 2020, this event was canceled due to COVID-19 restrictions, but returned in 2021.

Major events offered competition in different formats, bonus bulls, and more prize money. These major events were broadcast on CBS Sports Network and CBS Sports. The PBR did not visit New York City or Los Angeles in 2021 because of COVID-19 restrictions in said locations, and the Iron Cowboy event took place at Dickies Arena in Fort Worth, Texas, that year in the summer instead of its usual run in the winter. The UTB series returned to Madison Square Garden in New York City and Crypto.com Arena (formerly Staples Center) in Los Angeles in 2022. Since said year, neither Cheyenne or Nashville are stops on the UTB schedule. 

15/15 Bucking Battles are offered at some UTB events. This type of event matches the top 15 bull riders against the top 15 bulls in attendance. The matching is random. There is a separate purse for this event. Points are earned at the rate of 1 and 1/2 times the round points. Points do not factor into the event winner but do count toward the UTB standings. The winner is the bull rider with the highest ride score.

Qualifying for the PBR World Finals used to be based on points earned at all of the PBR's tours, which included the UTB elite tour, mid-level (Velocity Tour), and entry level (Touring Touring Division) tour, and the International tours. International tours include Australia, Brazil, Canada, and Mexico.  However, beginning in 2023, only points won on the UTB series count towards the PBR World Finals and world championship race. The top 35 riders in the UTB standings according to points earned, the Velocity Tour champion, the top three highest ranked finishers at the Velocity Tour Finals, and the highest ranked finishing international rider not already ranked inside the top 35 of the UTB standings all compete at the World Finals. 

Since 2022, the PBR World Finals concludes at Dickies Arena in Fort Worth, Texas. It awards almost $2.2 million. This includes the $1 million bonus to the World Champion, who also receives a trophy cup and championship gold belt buckle. The latter of which the value increased from $10,000 to $20,000 in 2018.

2018 inaugural season 
Monster Beverage Corporation took over sponsorship of the PBR’s Premier Series, replacing the Ford Motor Company, including the new title of the Unleash the Beast Series.

2020 season changes 
In March 2020, due to the COVID-19 pandemic, numerous stops on the PBR schedule were either cancelled or rescheduled to later dates. In the spring in the United States, the PBR held events that were closed to the public, but in the summer, events were allowed to have limited and socially distanced crowds. The PBR’s international tours in Canada and Australia were 
cleared to return later that year with similar rules for attendance, but there were no PBR events in Mexico and Brazil that year due to said countries’ restrictions on large events.

The PBR World Finals was moved from its usual location at T-Mobile Arena in Las Vegas because of Nevada state restrictions on large events to AT&T Stadium in Arlington, Texas. The World Finals consisted of a limited and socially distanced audience throughout the event. The event’s format changed to where all the top 35 point-earners, the Velocity Tour Champion, the top-three finishers from the Velocity Tour Finals, and the top finishing international invitee competed in the first three rounds. Only the top 30 riders based on total points returned for the fourth round. The top 15 riders after four rounds advanced to the Championship Round.

2021 season changes 
The number of riders who qualified for the Championship Round at Unleash the Beast Series events was cut from 15 to 12.

The PBR World Finals returned to T-Mobile Arena in Las Vegas in 2021 and had an event format similar to the one from 2020. All contestants rode in Rounds 1 through 4, then the top 30 point-earners in the event advanced to Round 4. The top 12 riders then  competed in the Championship Round.

2022 season changes 
In the past, the Premier Series schedule consisted of events taking place throughout the regular calendar year with the concluding PBR World Finals taking place in the autumn. But in 2022, the season was shortened, taking place from winter to spring. All subsequent Premier Series seasons now run like this. 

The PBR World Finals moved from its longtime home in Las Vegas, Nevada to Dickies Arena in Fort Worth, Texas. Also, the event’s format changed to a previous one that was used from 2004 to 2009. The World Finals was again an eight-round event split into two weekends where the first three rounds took place the first weekend, then the next five rounds took place the following weekend. 

The cut rules were changed for the 2022 World Finals. Previously, all riders participated in the first seven rounds before the cut based on the 15 highest scoring riders based on the combined score of the first seven rounds participated in the Championship Round.  Starting in 2022, a two-tiered cut was imposed. The first cut, at the end of the sixth round, eliminates riders who failed to make a qualified ride.  The second cut, at the end of the seventh round, is the top twelve riders in cumulative score who advance to the Championship Round.

2023 season changes 
The number of riders on the Premier Series was increased from 35 to 40; the last time being there were 40 riders in the Premier Series regular season was during the first five events of the 2012 season.

Previously, points won by riders on the Premier Series, as well as the PBR’s U.S. lower-level tours and international circuits counted for the world standings towards the world championship race. However, beginning in 2023, only points won on the U.S. Premier Series will count towards the world championship race.

See also
Professional Bull Riders
Built Ford Tough Series
Bud Light Cup Series

References

Bibliography

External links 
 Professional Bull Riders

Sports competitions in Las Vegas
Equestrian sports competitions in the United States
Rodeo competition series
Professional Bull Riders
Bucking bulls
Bull riders